West Kill is a hamlet (and census-designated place) in the town of Lexington, Greene County, New York, United States. West Kill flows through the hamlet. The ZIP Code is 12492.

Notes

Hamlets in Greene County, New York
Hamlets in New York (state)